Sir David Valentine Willcocks,  (30 December 1919 – 17 September 2015) was a British choral conductor, organist, composer and music administrator.  He was particularly well known for his association with the Choir of King's College, Cambridge, which he directed from 1957 to 1974, making frequent broadcasts and recordings.  Several of the descants and carol arrangements he wrote for the annual service of Nine Lessons and Carols were published in the series of books Carols for Choirs which he edited along with Reginald Jacques and John Rutter.  He was also director of the Royal College of Music in London.

During the Second World War (1939–1945) he served as an officer in the British Army, and was decorated with the Military Cross for his actions on Hill 112 during the Battle of Normandy in July 1944. His elder son, Jonathan Willcocks, is also a composer.

Biography 
Born in Newquay in Cornwall, Willcocks began his musical training as a chorister at Westminster Abbey from 1929 to 1934, following a recommendation by the then Master of the King's Music, Sir Henry Walford Davies, to Ernest Bullock. From 1934 to 1938, he was a music scholar at Clifton College, Bristol, where his teacher was Douglas Fox, his most important musical influence. He was appointed as organ scholar at King's College, Cambridge in 1939.  There, he met David Briggs, a choral scholar (bass).  Willcocks and Briggs would later be colleagues at King's, from 1959 to 1974, as Organist and Master of the Choristers and as Headmaster of King's College School, the school attended by the choirboys of King's College.

Military service
With the outbreak of the Second World War, he interrupted his studies in music to serve in the British Army.  He was commissioned as a second lieutenant in the Duke of Cornwall's Light Infantry (DCLI) on 15 February 1941, and was awarded the Military Cross as a temporary captain for his actions during the Battle of Normandy on the night of 10/11 July 1944, when he was serving with the 5th Battalion, DCLI as battalion intelligence officer.  The battalion, part of the 214th Infantry Brigade of the 43rd (Wessex) Infantry Division, was ordered to hold Hill 112 in Normandy, France, as part of Operation Epsom.  He carried out his duties outstandingly overnight, helping inflict severe casualties on the German forces by calling in artillery support to break up counter-attacks.  The battalion suffered over 250 casualties during the night, including the commanding officer and one of the company commanders.  This left Willcocks in command of the battalion headquarters, which by then was the furthest forward part of the battalion.  He rallied the men, enabling the battalion to stand firm and reorganise.  The award was gazetted on 21 December 1944.

Musical career
Willcocks returned to Cambridge in 1945 to complete his studies, and in 1947 was elected a Fellow of King's College and appointed Conductor of the Cambridge Philharmonic Society. In the same year, he became the organist at Salisbury Cathedral and the conductor of the Salisbury Musical Society. He moved to Worcester Cathedral in 1950 and remained until 1957, during which time he was organist of the cathedral, principal conductor of the Three Choirs Festival in 1951, 1954, and 1957, and conductor of the City of Birmingham Choir. From 1956 to 1974 he was also conductor of the Bradford Festival Choral Society, whilst continuing as guest conductor for their carol concerts into the early 1990s. Composers with whom he collaborated included Vaughan Williams, Britten, Howells and Tippett.

From 1957 to 1974 he held the post for which he is probably best known, Director of Music at King's College, Cambridge. He made numerous recordings with the college choir. (Among the most notable recordings was one of Thomas Tallis's Spem in alium, made in 1965.) The choir toured extensively, giving concerts worldwide, as well as garnering further acclaim internationally through television and radio appearances. Under the baton of Willcocks, Cambridge University Musical Society performed Benjamin Britten's War Requiem in 1963 in (Perugia) Milan, La Scala, and in Venice. The choir subsequently performed the work in Japan, Hong Kong, Portugal, and the Netherlands. In 1960, he also became the musical director of the Bach Choir in London.

He held these positions at Cambridge until the 1970s when he accepted the post of Director of the Royal College of Music. In the 1971 Queen's Birthday Honours, he was appointed a Commander of the Order of the British Empire (CBE), and was created a Knight Bachelor in 1977 in the Queen's Silver Jubilee Honours. He held honorary degrees in England from the Universities of Bradford, Bristol, Exeter, Leicester, and Sussex, and from the Royal College of Music in London; in the US from Luther College (Iowa), St. Olaf College (Minnesota), Rowan University and Westminster Choir College (New Jersey); and in Canada from the Universities of Trinity College, Toronto, and Victoria B.C. All in all, his honorary degrees numbered over fifty. He was also President of the City of Bath Bach Choir and Exeter Festival Chorus. For the 1981 wedding of Prince Charles and Diana Spencer, Willcocks served as guest director of music and conducted the Bach Choir, who sang during the signing of the registers. The event was watched by an estimated global TV audience of 750 million.

After stepping down from the Royal College, Willcocks resumed conducting and editing scores as his primary activities. A 1990 profile in The New York Times noted that he had made nine visits to the United States in the previous year, including conducting Evensong at St. Thomas Church in Manhattan and conducting the Mormon Tabernacle Choir. In live performance, he regularly conducted Mozart's Requiem at the Mostly Mozart festival in New York.

On 15 May 2010, a celebration of his contribution to music took place at the Royal Albert Hall in London, where pieces selected by Willcocks were performed by singers who are part of the Really Big Chorus. Special guests included choristers from King's College Choir, Cambridge, who performed three pieces.

He died at home in Cambridge on the morning of 17 September 2015.

Recordings and broadcasts 

Willcocks made recordings with the (London) Bach Choir, the English Chamber Orchestra, the Academy of St Martin in the Fields, the Jacques Orchestra, the Philharmonia Orchestra, and the London Symphony Orchestra as well as with the Choir of King's College, Cambridge, with whom he regularly conducted the Nine Lessons and Carols service on Christmas Eve, broadcast by the BBC every year since 1931. With The Bach Choir, in particular he recorded works by Johann Sebastian Bach, especially his motets and, sung in English, his St John Passion and a stately rendition of the St Matthew Passion, a piece he regularly conducted for broadcast Easter performances. He also served as general editor of the Church Music series of the Oxford University Press.   During his years at King's, an early and frequently reissued recording of the Allegri Miserere was made in March 1963 by the choir, conducted by David Willcocks, and featuring a 12-year old Roy Goodman, later a distinguished conductor, as the treble soloist. In 1965, he made his famous recording, with the Choir of King's College, of Tallis's Spem in alium.

He is particularly known for his widely used choral arrangements of Christmas carols, many of which were originally written or arranged for the Service of Nine Lessons and Carols at King's and/or the Bach Choir's Christmas concerts. They are published in the five Carols for Choirs anthologies (1961–1987), edited by Willcocks with Reginald Jacques (first volume) or John Rutter. The descant arrangements in particular are among the most famous and well-loved musical components. He was Music Director Emeritus of King's College Choir, and an Honorary Fellow of King's College, Cambridge.

Outside the world of classical music, Willcocks conducted his London Bach Choir for the studio recording of "You Can't Always Get What You Want" by the Rolling Stones in 1968.

A notable broadcast took place on BBC Radio 4 on 21 September 2010 in a series called Soul Music, when Willcocks profiled Fauré's Requiem. The programme included his memories of the fighting at Hill 112. The profile also featured Christina, widow of Olaf Schmid. Willcocks questioned the morality of war.

Selected Compositions 

 Five Folksongs (1972)
 Introduction (Fanfare), Variations and Fughetto on the Hymn Tune Jena (Breslau) (1986). Commissioned by the Detroit chapter of the American Guild of Organists, premiered by Marilyn Mason at the 1986 AGO national convention.
 A Ceremony of Psalms (1989)
 Tomorrow shall be my dancing day

Honours

Commonwealth honours
 Commonwealth honours

Military decorations

Scholastic

 Fellowships

Honorary degrees

References

External links 

Interview with Sir David Willcocks, 22 January 1989
 Martin Cullingford: Conductor and organist Sir David Willcocks has died Gramophone 17 September 2015
 first part of an interview by Alan Macfarlane 11 December 2008 (video)
 second part of an interview by Alan Macfarlane 15 December 2008 (video)
 A Life in Music. Conversations with Sir David Willcocks and Friends. William Owen, ed. Oxford University Press, New York,m 2008.

1919 births
2015 deaths
Alumni of King's College, Cambridge
Fellows of King's College, Cambridge
Recipients of the Military Cross
English choral conductors
British male conductors (music)
English classical organists
British male organists
People from Newquay
People educated at Clifton College
Academics of the Royal College of Music
Grammy Award winners
Knights Bachelor
Conductors (music) awarded knighthoods
Musicians awarded knighthoods
Commanders of the Order of the British Empire
Duke of Cornwall's Light Infantry officers
British Army personnel of World War II
Honorary Members of the Royal Academy of Music
Honorary Members of the Royal Philharmonic Society
Cathedral organists
Bach musicians
Choristers at Westminster Abbey
Recipients of the Medal of the Royal College of Organists
20th-century British conductors (music)
20th-century classical composers
Military personnel from Cornwall
21st-century British conductors (music)
21st-century classical composers
Organ Scholars of King's College, Cambridge
Male classical organists
People educated at Westminster Abbey Choir School